The masked water tyrant (Fluvicola nengeta) is a species of bird in the family Tyrannidae, the tyrant flycatchers, one of three in the genus Fluvicola.

Distribution and habitat
It is found in its major range in eastern and southeastern Brazil in the caatinga and extreme eastern cerrado, and also Atlantic coastal regions; a second smaller disjunct range occurs on the Pacific side of South America in western Ecuador, and coastal border regions of northwest Peru.  Its natural habitats are subtropical or tropical mangrove forests, subtropical or tropical moist shrubland, and heavily degraded former forest.

Gallery

References

External links

"Masked water tyrant" videos on the Internet Bird Collection
"Masked water tyrant" photo gallery VIREO Photo-(Close-up)
 

masked water tyrant
Birds of Brazil
Birds of Ecuador
masked water tyrant
masked water tyrant
Taxonomy articles created by Polbot